Controversia is an album by Danny Rivera, Vicente Carattini y Los Cantores de San Juan and Alpha IV. This album was Danny Rivera's first Puerto-Rican-Christmas-Music album. The title song "Controversia" (Controversy) is about an argument between Danny and Vicente in which Vicente accuses Danny of stealing Christmas gigs from him by becoming a new Christmas-music singer. At the end of the song, vocalist Alma Galarza comes in to break up the "fight" and at the end they both make peace. In real life, however, Danny did steal something from Vicente. For his next album Ofrenda he wanted vocalist Alma Galaza (who had been singing with Vicente for 8 years) to be a special guest vocalist, but only if she quit Vicente and his group. Alma went with Danny with whom she recorded several albums and toured for several years.

This album was dedicated to Puerto Rican composer Mario Enrique, who composed 3 song for the album.

Despite the success of this album, it is no longer available on CD. The rights for this and other albums by Danny were bought by Disco Hit which in 2011 released a best of compilation called "20 Exitos Navideños" ("20 Christmas Hits") which included 6 songs from Controversia and other songs from Ofrenda, Mi Canción es Paz and Pido Paz.

Album cover and name

The cover was inspired by Halley's Comet. The comet has nothing to do with the title of the album or any of its songs. It is not clear if the photo is that of Halley's Comet or simply a made-up photo.

Track listing

Musicians

Danny Rivera - lead vocals
 Vicente Carattini - lead vocals 
 Alma Galarza (Vicente Carattini y Los Cantores de San Juan) - lead vocals and female dialog on "Trulla Pa' Tí" (credited on the album simply as backing vocals) 
 José Gonzalez - Puerto Rican cuatro, guitar
 Jorge Hernandez - requinto, Puerto Rican cuatro
 Jorge Cancel - guitar
 Chebin Perez - guitar
 Javier Hernandez - bass, sinfonía, percusión
 Pablo Figueroa - guiro
 Lillian Colón - Venezuelan cuatro
 Hector Rodriguez - plenera
 Janet Hernandez (Vicente Carattini y Los Cantores de San Juan) - backing vocals
 Marinés Colón - backing vocals

Production
Musical arrangements: José Gonzalez, Javier Hernandez, Rei Peña, Alpha IV and Los Cantores de San Juan
Musical director - Javier Hernandez
Producers - Gladys Hernandez and Vicente Carattini
Recording engineers - Rei Peña and Javier Hernandez
Mixing - Javier Hernandez
Art and cover design - Heriberto Gonzalez
Distribution - Alpha Records

References

1985 albums
Danny Rivera albums
Vicente Carattini albums